The Slovak Hockey Hall of Fame (Slovak: Sieň slávy slovenského hokeja) honors the contributions that individuals have made to the sport of hockey in Slovakia.  It opened on November 30, 2002. The hall is located in Bratislava, Slovakia.

Members of the Slovak Hockey Hall of Fame

See also 
Slovakia national ice hockey team

External links
 Official website of the Slovak Hockey Hall of Fame

Ice hockey in Slovakia
Halls of fame in Slovakia
Ice hockey museums and halls of fame
Awards established in 2002